is a loosely defined trend from the 2000s that involved an increase of Shibuya-kei influence in anime soundtracks. The term is a portmanteau of "Shibuya-kei" and "Akiba-kei". Both were 1990s cultural movements associated with musical and otaku interests, respectively, and Akishibu-kei was thought to have represented a merging of the two.

Overview 
From mid-1990s, anime music was diversified due to composers like Yoko Kanno who mastered idioms from many genres such as classical music, jazz and ethnic music. In 2002, Shibuya-kei band Round Table invited female singer Nino as the guest vocal and offered the song "Let Me Be With You" for anime Chobits. The soundtrack of Chobits was composed by Keitaro Takanami, the former member of Pizzicato Five. From then, Masao Fukuda from FlyingDog, the musical director of Chobits appointed many Shibuya-kei musicians as anisongs/anime soundtracks composers. Fukuda is considered as tastemaker of Akishibu-kei. Some artists from FlyingDog such as Kana Hanazawa was provided songs by Shibuya-kei composers. Hanazawa is considered as the representative singer of Akishibu-kei.

Dimitri from Paris, Turkish-born French DJ provided the song “Neko Mimi mode” to Tsukuyomi: Moon Phase as the opening theme. Since he was one of the contemporary artists popular among Shibuya-Kei fans, "Neko Mimi mode" is considered to be a representative song of Akishibu-kei music though this song is sometimes considered as an example of denpa song.

Examples of Akishibu-Kei anime songs  

 "Let me be with you" by ROUND TABLE featuring Nino (Opening theme of Chobits.Composed by Kitagawa Katsutoshi)
 "Onnanoko ♡ Otokonoko" by Yuko Ogura (Ending theme for School Rumble Composed by Yasuaki Konishi)
 "Neko Mimi mode" by Dimitri from Paris (Opening theme of Tsukuyomi: Moon Phase)
 "Dramatic Market Ride" by Aya Suzaki (Opening theme of Tamako Market Composed by Tomoko Kataoka)
 "Yukitoki" and "Harumodoki" by Yanagi Nagi (Both opening theme of My Youth Romantic Comedy Is Wrong, As I Expected Composed by Kitagawa Katsutoshi)
 "Your Voice" by Rhodanthe*(Ending theme of Kin-iro Mosaic. Composed by Reiji Okii
 "Rocket Beat" by Kiyono Yasuno (Ending theme of Cardcaptor Sakura: Clear Card'' Composed by Kitagawa Katsutoshi)

References 

Music in Tokyo
Japanese styles of music
Music scenes
Pop music genres
Shibuya-kei
J-pop
Retro style
2000s in Japanese music
Japanese subcultures
Japanese youth culture
Moe (slang)
Otaku